Cumberland South is a provincial electoral district in Cumberland Country, Nova Scotia, Canada, that elects one member of the Nova Scotia House of Assembly. The riding was created before the 1993 election from most of Cumberland West and Cumberland Centre ridings and a small part of Cumberland East.

The communities of Oxford, Parrsboro and Springhill are within its boundaries.

The Member of the Legislative Assembly since 1998 has been held by the Progressive Conservative Party of Nova Scotia. A Tory stronghold, Cumberland South has been dominated by Progressive Conservative Murray Scott for over a decade and now Tory Rushton

The 2012 redistribution saw the riding gain territory from Cumberland North.

Geography

Members of the Legislative Assembly
This riding has elected the following Members of the Legislative Assembly:

Election results

1993 general election

1998 general election

1999 general election

2003 general election

2006 general election

2009 general election

2010 by-election

|-
 
|Progressive Conservative
|Jamie Baillie
|align="right"|3,262
|align="right"|57.20%
|align="right"|-10.26

 
|New Democratic Party
|Scott McKee
|align="right"|276
|align="right"|4.84%
|align="right"|-21.06
|}

2013 general election

|-
 
|Progressive Conservative
|Jamie Baillie
|align="right"| 3,655
|align="right"| 51.0%
|align="right"| -6.2 
|-
 
|Liberal
|Kenny Jackson
|align="right"| 2,884
|align="right"| 40.2%
|align="right"| +2.2
|-
 
|New Democratic Party
|Larry Duchesne
|align="right"| 486
|align="right"| 6.8%
|align="right"| +2.0
|-

|-

|}

2017 general election

2018 by-election

2021 general election

References

Cumberland County, Nova Scotia
Nova Scotia provincial electoral districts